The River of Consciousness is a collection of ten essays by the writer, naturalist, and neurologist Oliver Sacks. Some of the essays are dedicated to specific figures such as Darwin, Freud, and William James.

Synopsis
The River of Consciousness compiles the following essays: 

 Darwin and the Meaning of Flowers
 Speed
 Sentience: The Mental Lives of Plants and Worms
 The Other Road: Freud as a Neurologist 
 The Fallibility of Memory
 Mishearings
 The Creative Self
 A General Feeling of Disorder
 The River of Consciousness 
 Scotoma: Forgetting and Neglect in Science

Reception
The Chicago Tribune reviewed The River of Consciousness, Praising Sacks' "ability to braid wide reading". In a review for the Wall Street Journal Laura J. Snyder notes that the volume "reminds us, in losing Sacks we lost a gifted and generous storyteller.” In a review published by  The Guardian the physician Gavin Francis writes: For those thousands of correspondents, The River of Consciousness will feel like a reprieve – we get to spend time again with Sacks the botanist, the historian of science, the marine biologist and, of course, the neurologist.

References 

Books by Oliver Sacks
2017 non-fiction books
Pan Books books
Alfred A. Knopf books